= Neosporidesmium malloti =

Scientific classification
- Kingdom: Fungi
- Division: Ascomycota
- Class: incertae sedis
- Genus: Neosporidesmium
- Species: N. malloti

Binomial name
- Neosporidesmium malloti Jian Ma & X.G. Zhang

Species of fungus

Neosporidesmium malloti is a species of anamorphic ascomycete fungi, first found in tropical forests in Hainan, China, specifically in dead branches of Mallotus hookerianus, hence its name.
